The 2004–05 Florida Gators men's basketball team represented the University of Florida in the sport of basketball during the 2004–05 college basketball season.  The Gators competed in Division I of the National Collegiate Athletic Association (NCAA) and the Eastern Division of the Southeastern Conference (SEC).  They were led by head coach Billy Donovan, and played their home games in the O'Connell Center on the university's Gainesville, Florida campus.

The Gators finished the regular season with a 20–7 record and entered the SEC Tournament. They swept through the SEC Tournament, beating Kentucky in the final. They then entered NCAA Tournament.  They beat Ohio University in the first round 67–62.  The Gators then played Villanova University in the second round and lost 65–76.

Roster

Coaches

Schedule and results

|-

|-
!colspan=8| SEC tournament

|-

|-

|-
!colspan=8| NCAA tournament 

|-
| colspan="8" | Tournament seedings in parentheses.

Regular season

Accomplishments

References 

Florida Gators men's basketball seasons
Florida
Florida
Florida Gators men's basketball team
Florida Gators men's basketball team